Madrasi Para is a neighborhood in the Karachi Cantonment area  of Karachi, Sindh, Pakistan. This neighborhood is located close to the Jinnah Post Graduate Medical Centre. The population of this neighborhood is mostly Tamil Hindus that migrated in early 20th century before the independence of Pakistan when Karachi was developed during the British Raj. The Maripata Temple was located in this neighborhood which was the biggest Tamil Hindu temple in Karachi before being demolished.

See also
 Tamils in Pakistan

References

External links 
 Karachi Website

Neighbourhoods of Karachi
Tamil diaspora in Pakistan